Andreyevskaya is a rural locality (a village) in Posyolok Ivanishchi, Gus-Khrustalny District, Vladimir Oblast, Russia. The population was 2 as of 2010.

Geography 
Andreyevskaya is located 45 km northwest of Gus-Khrustalny (the district's administrative centre) by road. Stepanovo is the nearest rural locality.

References 

Rural localities in Gus-Khrustalny District
Sudogodsky Uyezd